Rubén Ramírez Hidalgo was the defending champion; however, he was eliminated already in the first round by Ivo Klec.

Kenny de Schepper eliminated Iñigo Cervantes-Huegun, Adrian Mannarino, Roberto Bautista-Agut, Illya Marchenko and won in the final against Iván Navarro, 2–6, 7–5, 6–3.

Seeds

Draw

Finals

Top half

Bottom half

References
 Main draw
 Qualifying draw

Men's Singles
2011